Bonner House may refer to, and George Bonner House may in some cases refer to:

Bonner–Sharp–Gunn House, Carrollton, GA, listed on the NRHP in Georgia
Bonner House (Bath, North Carolina), listed on the NRHP in North Carolina
George Bonner Jr. House, Midway, UT, listed on the NRHP in Utah
George Bonner Sr. House, Midway, UT, listed on the NRHP in Utah
William Bonner House, Midway, UT, listed on the NRHP in Utah